Kaloi k'Agathoi is a theatre company specialising in Classical drama. It is based in Herefordshire and operates throughout the UK. The company stages original adaptations of Ancient Greek plays, and has developed an educational programme to promote and foster the teaching of Classical dramatic texts through drama.  Improvisation is a key feature of Kaloi k'Agathoi performances, facilitating interactivity and enabling educational workshops to be tailored easily and effectively.  In August 2009 Kaloi k'Agathoi performed their version of Agamemnon and Daedalus and Icarus for Three Choirs Plus, part of the Three Choirs Festival.

As well as working with a diversity of artists, Kaloi k'Agathoi places an emphasis on community involvement in order to introduce new audiences to Classical theatre: in January 2007 it became a registered Community Interest Company.

The name

Kaloi k'Agathoi is properly written in Ancient Greek (καλοι κ'αγαθοι), and is literally translated as "The Beautiful and the Good". The term is difficult to translate accurately, however, as it is the term used for ancient Athenian society, so "the Beautiful and the Good" could be said to lose this connotation. Modern translations might be the "It-crowd" or "A-listers", but these too fail to convey the full meaning of the phrase as it would have been interpreted in Ancient Athens.

Plays

2002 - Euripides' Elektra
2002 - Aristophanes' Frogs
2003 - Menander's Dyskolos ('The Old Git')
2004 - Euripides' Hippolytus
2005 - Euripides' Medea and Bacchae
2006 - Sophocles' Philoctetes
2007 - Aristophanes' Clouds
2009 - Aeschylus' Agamemnon

External links
The official website of Kaloi k'Agathoi

Amateur theatre companies in England
Culture in Herefordshire
Education in Herefordshire
Companies based in Herefordshire